Miltochrista pallida is a moth of the family Erebidae. It was described by Otto Vasilievich Bremer in 1864. It is found in the Russian Far East (Middle Amur, Primorye, southern Sakhalin, Kunashir), China (Jiangsu, Jiangxi, Zhejiang, Shaanxi, Shandong, Hunan, Yunan, Fujiang, Sichuan), Taiwan and Korea.

References

 Arctiidae genus list at Butterflies and Moths of the World of the Natural History Museum

pallida
Moths described in 1864
Moths of Asia